Urban planning in Sydney, Australia has been done formally and informally since at least the city's establishment in 1788. The city has been characterised as an 'accidental city', with planning advocate JD Fitzgerald claiming that it was "a city without a plan, save whatever planning was due to the errant goat".

History

Early colonial planning 

The founder of Sydney, Governor Arthur Phillip, planned from the beginning for the penal colony to eventually become a town, writing that the settlement (which he wanted to name 'Albion') should have uniform building style, streets that were 200 feet wide, as well as building allotments of 60 by 150 feet. However, no architects, town planners, or surveyors came with the First Fleet, with engineers Augustus Alt and William Dawes left to the task of following Phillip's intentions, and consequently drew up a plan for a grid pattern with a town centre on the western hills above where the Tank Stream ran into the Sydney Cove. The contemporary Lang Street was meant to be the High Street, and was meant to be a grand avenue with views across to Bennelong Point. However, most of the plan never came to fruition. Instead, the early road network was at least in part based on Indigenous walking paths, which themselves followed natural contours such as ridgelines or the Tank Stream. However, their plan for Parramatta was realised, following a grid and with a 62 metre wide high street (now known as George Street).

Governor Lachlan Macquarie and the New South Wales Government Architect, Francis Greenway, made major contributions to the planning and design of early colonial Sydney. This included 265 public works, such as Parramatta Road and Old South Head Road.  Greenway had also proposed making a complete plan for the town, with a grand square, major public buildings, as well as a bridge across the harbour at Dawes Point. Despite such early planning, many of the houses in the convict settlement were built erratically, with an 1832 Report on the Limits of Sydney  by Surveyor General Thomas Mitchell noting that peripheral land of the settlement had "been alienated and that roads and boundary lines were oblique and irregular", which he tried in vain to regularize. The first limits on building development were however passed with the Police Act of 1833, as well as the Street Alignments Act of 1834 and the Building Act of 1837 (based on the London Building Act of 1774). The incorporation of the City of Sydney in 1842 created local government ostensibly able to manage growth. However, its ability to govern was hampered by powerful local interests, and the city had severe problems by the 1870s.

Beginning of modern planning 

In the 19th century, the sanitary movement agitated for urban improvement for better public health. Following the outbreaks of disease and accumulation of unsanitary buildings, the City of Sydney Improvement Act was passed in 1879. This was followed by the Land for Public Purposes Acquisition Act in 1880, allowing the creation of parklands. Parks from this era include Redfern Park and (?). A minimum width for streets of 20.1 metres was set in 1881. However, by the 1890s the ideas of laissez-faire liberalism were dominant.

In 1900, an outbreak of bubonic plague took place in the city. Inspired by British royal commissions into improving urban conditions, such as the Poor Law Commission, the 1909 Royal Commission for the Improvement of the City of Sydney and Its Suburbs was established for a similar purpose. The commission recommended building underground railways in the city centre and electrifying the suburban lines. A new Building Act to regulate urban design was also suggested, as well as the demolishing of Darlinghurst Gaol for a park or an monumental building.

A key figure in the beginning of formal planning in Sydney was John Sulman, who had begun advocating for planning in The Daily Telegraph in 1907, and gave testimony to the 1909 Royal Commission. Instead of a grid plan (such as the Hoddle Grid in Melbourne), he advocated for a 'spider's web' network of roads. Other ideas of his included the extension of Martin Place and the widening of various streets. He also taught urban planning at the University of Sydney.

Visionary plans 

The City Beautiful movement also inspired Sydney planning.   Another influence was the garden city movement, of which Daceyville , built in 1912, was a model suburb. The husband-wife team of Walter Burley and Marion Mahony Griffin, who had planned Canberra with influence from both movements, also designed the suburb of Castlecrag. At the time, Castlecrag was noted as an experiment in communal and community planning and living.

In the 1920s, government engineer John Bradfield proposed a railway scheme to improve transportation in the city, which included an underground rail loop under the CBD (later constructed as the City Circle) and a harbour crossing (which he built as the Sydney Harbour Bridge). The unrealised parts of the vision included three new inner-city rail lines, with a loop through the Eastern Suburbs (later built in a truncated form as the Eastern Suburbs railway line), a line to the west from Petersham through Annandale, Leichhardt, Rozelle and Balmain to the CBD, as well as a line over the bridge to the Northern Beaches (for which extra tracks were built on the bridge, used by trams until 1958 before conversion to traffic lanes).

Metropolitan planning 
While the Local Government Act of 1919 had given councils more power over development, metropolitan growth was left to the market. Despite lobbying in the 1920s, no metropolitan planning authority was put in place and planning in effect meant local government micromanagement. A greater city movement failed as it threatened local vested interests.  However, in 1945 the City of Sydney was expanded to include eight surrounding suburbs, while a new regional level of government was established with the Cumberland County Council. This allowed for the creation of the 1948 County of Cumberland planning scheme, which has been called "the most definitive expression of a public policy on the form and content of an Australian metropolitan area ever attempted". Drawing partial inspiration from the 1944 Greater London Plan, it introduced zoning, employment zones, open space acquisitions, and a green belt. However, especially the last part proved contentious and the plan in many ways did not succeed.

The County Council was superseded in 1964 by the State Planning Authority, which prepared the 1968 Sydney Region Outline Plan. This plan aimed to decentralize the city by building along rail corridors and developing new town centres. The green belt meanwhile became the Western Sydney Parklands. The Greater Western Sydney area became home to families resettled from the inner-city slums to new suburbs, as well as lower income migrants. Infrastructure provision was generally not good, with the first hospital (Westmead Hospital) opening in 1978, and the first university (Western Sydney University) in 1989. The locals of the area became subsequently known pejoratively as 'Westies'. Public housing was built in various locations, for example Green Valley and Mount Druitt. Meanwhile, the central business district spread upwards, with the historic 45.7 metre height limit having been lifted in 1957, followed by the construction of the first skyscraper, the AMP Building, in 1962. Harry Seidler designed many landmark towers, such as Australia Square.

Urban renewal and consolidation 
The Sydney Cove Redevelopment Authority was set up in 1970 to oversee urban renewal in the inner-city. Its plans for a redevelopment of the historic Rocks precinct into high-rise towers was however blocked by the so-called green bans, which enforced strikes on various controversial redevelopment projects throughout Sydney. This led to changes in the New South Wales planning system, with the introduction of environmental and heritage conservation legislation, and the formation of the Land and Environment Court of New South Wales. A successful redevelopment project was undertaken in the Darling Harbour area in the 1980s.

As the city faced a scarcity of land in the 1980s following urban sprawl, urban consolidation became the new target of planning. The new regional plan, Sydney Into Its Third Century, aimed to increase urban density in turn.

Contemporary plans 

The current main plan for Sydney developed by the Greater Sydney Commission, The Greater Sydney Region Plan - A Metropolis of Three Cities, lays out the vision for an integrated approach to land use and transport planning and aims to boost the liveability, productivity and sustainability for a growing Sydney population.

The plan identifies three major cities:

 Central River City
 Eastern Harbour City
 Western Sydney Parkland City

Urban renewal corridors across Greater Sydney have been identified in the plan (see below). According to population forecasts, it is anticipated that revitalisation in these areas will enable capacity for new housing, aligned with sufficient infrastructure to help supply an additional 725,000 homes needed to meet demand.

See also 

 Urban planning in Australia

References 

Urban planning in Australia
Sydney